This is a list of 1965 events that occurred in the Socialist Republic of Romania.

Incumbents
President: Gheorghe Gheorghiu-Dej Ending –19 March 1965; then Nicolae Ceaușescu Beginning –22 March 1965

Prime Minister: Ion Gheorghe Maurer

Events

March

 22 March – Nicolae Ceaușescu becomes the first secretary of the Romanian Communist Party, after the sudden death of previous leader Gheorghe Gheorghiu Dej on 19 March that year.

Births

February
 5 February – Gheorghe Hagi, Romanian footballer, manager and club owner

April
 30 April – Dorina Mitrea, Romanian-American mathematician.

May
 16 May – Rodica Dunca, Romanian artistic gymnast

June
 22 June – George Marinescu, Romanian mathematician.

December
6 December – Cornel Mihai Ungureanu, Romanian novelist and journalist

Deaths

March 
 12 March – George Călinescu, literary critic (born 1899).
 19 March – Gheorghe Gheorghiu-Dej, Romanian communist leader, 47th Prime Minister of Romania (born 1901).

April
 22 April – Petre Antonescu, Romanian architect (b. 1873).

December
 11 December – George Constantinescu, Romanian scientist (b. 1881)

References

Years of the 20th century in Romania
1960s in Romania
 
Romania
Romania